Dallasiellus lugubris is a species of burrowing bug in the family Cydnidae. It is found in the Caribbean Sea, Central America, North America, and South America.

References

Cydnidae
Articles created by Qbugbot
Insects described in 1860